The Embassy of Sweden in Luanda was Sweden's diplomatic mission in Angola. The first Swedish ambassador was accredited to Luanda in 1976. The ambassador was also accredited to São Tomé. The embassy mainly focused on Sweden and trade promotion activities. The embassy closed in November 2022 following a decision by Sweden's government. The Swedish ambassador is from 1 December 2022 based in Stockholm, Sweden.

History
Sweden was one of the first countries to recognize Angola in 1975 and diplomatic relations were established as early as February 1976. The Swedish embassy in Luanda opened in October 1976, six months after the independence. Sweden was also one of the first countries to initiate economic aid cooperation with Angola. A special economic aid office was set up on 1 February 1977. Sweden supported the country's liberation struggle, and during the Angolan Civil War in 1975–2002, Sweden was one of the largest donors. Due to the very rapid economic development in Angola, Swedish economic aid was phased out during the 2000s. The Swedish embassy in Luanda is co-located with Norway's embassy. The embassy is mainly focused on Sweden and trade promotion activities.

On 19 December 2007, the Swedish government decided to close the embassy in Luanda. According to the government's assessment, for example, the promotion of Swedish interests in the country and reporting on Angola's economic and political development could be handled by the Swedish embassy in Pretoria, as well as by the Swedish Trade Council which has been in place in Luanda since October 2007. The closure would take place by 31 August 2008 and an honorary consulate would instead be opened. On 21 August 2008, it was decided to repeal the decision to close the embassy in Luanda. Instead, a pilot project was implemented with a new type of miniature embassy with a limited operational assignment. This was something that would ensure Sweden's presence in Angola at a lower cost. On 2 October 2008, the decision was made to open a secretariat for trade at the embassy to develop trade relations with Angola. The office became a natural part of the embassy's operations and was run by the Swedish Trade Council.

The project with the miniature embassy in Luanda meant that the embassy's mission was in principle limited to export promotion, but there was also handling of consular assistance. The ambassador, who is the only seconded official, shares premises and reception with the Swedish Trade Council and Ericsson. By agreement, the Swedish Trade Council was responsible for the embassy's financial administration. The embassy also had two local employees, a secretary and a chauffeur. The ambassador had a domestic worker. A Swedish honorary consulate on site handled the limited consular activities. The honorary consul was also a representative of the National Property Board of Sweden on site, which made it easier because property management and care in a place like Luanda would otherwise have taken a lot of time for the embassy. In the absence of the ambassador, the Trade Council's trade secretary has been notified as a diplomat, he has been able to enter the ambassador's place on several occasions. But the solution has been vulnerable. Instead, the ambassador's absence has sometimes been resolved by sending a substitute or by the ambassador simply acting as a chargé d'affaires.

On 22 December 2010, the Swedish government decided to close the embassy in Luanda. The embassy closed on 1 July 2011. On 22 September 2011, it was decided that the embassy would be re-established following a decision that was a result of the agreement reached on 1 August 2011 between the governing parties and the Social Democrats. In November 2021, the Swedish government announced that it intends to close the embassy in Luanda during the second half of 2022. The embassy in November 2022 following a decision by Sweden's government. Bilateral relations will continue under new forms. On 1 December 2022, an ambassador for Angola took office, stationed in Stockholm. The ambassador will travel to Angola regularly. A Swedish honorary consulate in Luanda is being established.

Buildings

Chancery
The current chancery was built in 1984-85 after drawings by two architects at White & Partners, Rune Falk and Lisa Hanson. Architect Leif Lindstrand in Järrestad in Scania was the project manager and over two years commuted 22 times between Sturup and Luanda. The chancery was inaugurated on 31 January 1986 by the Minister for Energy Birgitta Dahl assisted by the director general of the National Swedish Board of Public Building (Byggnadsstyrelsen) Hans Löwbeer. Sweden was the first country to build a new embassy in Angola after the independence in 1975. The building cost SEK 39 million and, in addition to the chancery, also contained 26 terraced houses. In 2014, embassy building became an embassy office for both Sweden and Norway. The National Property Board of Sweden began the conversion to two embassies in the same building in 2013. The Swedish and Norwegian embassy buildings in Angola are located in Miramar, an area in the central part of the capital Luanda. Surrounding buildings are characterized by residential buildings in 1-2 floors with tree plantings facing the street. The scale of the embassy building is adapted to the surrounding residential buildings. The entrance level contains a reception, conversation room and waiting room as well as a janitor room, storage room, living room, library and office room. On the upper level are the ambassador's office, meeting rooms and other chancellery premises.

The building's frame is made of cast-in-place concrete with inner and outer walls of plastered concrete masonry units. Window sections are made of aluminum with insulating glass panes. Light Nordic wood in the form of birch is found in the interior. The doors consist of birch with steel frames and the fixed interior also consists to some extent of birch. The floors are consistently tiled. In connection with the embassy being divided by Sweden and Norway, it was completely renovated by the National Property Board of Sweden. This work was carried out in 2013–14.

Residence
The ambassadorial residence is located at one of Angola's most exclusive addresses, just a few hundred meters from the President's residence. Sweden has had the residence since the autumn of 1976.

Following the decision to close the embassy in 2010, all furniture and all other furnishings were sold to a Swedish businessman for SEK 135,000. In July 2011, the dismantling was completed. But already in August 2011, the government backed down after an agreement with the Social Democrats. After the embassy and residence were reopened, the ambassador now had to rent back the old interior.

Heads of Mission

References

External links
 
 

Luanda
Defunct diplomatic missions
Angola–Sweden relations
Sweden
1976 establishments in Angola
2022 disestablishments in Angola